Harpalus kirgisicus is a species of ground beetle in the subfamily Harpalinae. It was described by Victor Motschulsky in 1844.

References

kirgisicus
Beetles described in 1844